WMJD is a Classic Country formatted broadcast radio station licensed to Grundy, Virginia, serving Grundy and Buchanan County, Virginia. WMJD is owned and operated by Peggy Sue Broadcasting Corporation.

Programming
WMJD carries ABC Radio News at the top of every hour. WMJD carried Paul Harvey's "News & Comment" program in the morning and midday, along with "The Rest of the Story" in the afternoons until Harvey's death.

WMJD carries the entire schedule of Sprint Cup Series, Nationwide Series, and Craftsman Truck Series races from MRN Radio and PRN Radio. WMJD also carries all of the talk/news programs from MRN and PRN as well, including "NASCAR Live".

Frequency change
On July 27, 2005, WMJD and sister WRIC swapped frequencies, with WRIC moving to 97.7, a frequency that WMJD had been at since the station went on the air.

References

External links
 Classic Country 100.7 WMJD Online
 

MJD
Country radio stations in the United States
Radio stations established in 1965